Lalin Michael Jinasena (born 6 June 1977) is a Sri Lankan hotelier, entrepreneur and interior designer.  He is the founder and CEO of Lalin Michael Jinasena & Co.

Early life
Jinasena was born in Colombo, Sri Lanka, and attended S. Thomas' Preparatory School, Colombo, and the Asian International School Colombo. His passion for design was prominent from an early age and was something he developed further by completing an undergraduate degree in product design and a business master at Loughborough University in the UK.

He is married to Fashion Designer Michelle Sielman-Jinasena and lives in Colombo and Singapore.

Career
Lalin began his career in hospitality by managing two hotels belonging to the Jinasena Group. In 2006, he ventured away from the family business and founded LM Jinasena & Co. The group comprises companies, which he created himself, as well as companies, which were built up by his father, Dr. Nihal Jinasena over the last 35 years under the Jinasena Group.  The Jinasena Group, a 108-year-old family company and one of the largest conglomerates in Sri Lanka, decided in 2009 to divide its assets between the 4 Jinasena brothers.

The companies, which came to Dr. Nihal Jinasena in this division, are now part of the LMJ Group. The LMJ Group is involved and pioneering in Hospitality and Food & Beverage, manufacturing and export, trading, web development, and includes an subsidiary interior decor company.

Design
Lalin's Design skills in Conceptual Design, Interiors and Furniture are sought throughout the world. Along with his Interior Design company he has created interior spaces and buildings for numerous projects that have been hailed in some of the most established design publications. Jinasena's Designs are edgy, modern and have no parallels.

Lalin Jinasena: "I try to remain uninfluenced by other artists' work and hence tend not to read too much about them or to study their styles. The idea is to be free of inadvertent influences when creating designs which I want to come from within".

Casa Colombo
Jinasena's most popular work must be the multi awarded Casa Colombo, a private boutique hotel with 12 designer suites and 3 restaurants housed within a grand 200-year-old mansion in Colombo, Sri Lanka.  Jinasena acquired the historical building 2006 and restored it in only 8 months time. He designed every piece of furniture and decor himself, solely using craftsmen and materials from Sri Lanka.

Casa Colombo has been voted "The Leading Hotel in Sri Lanka 2011" at the World Travel Awards, "2011 Asia Pacific Hotel Award Prize" for best Interior Design and awarded the Certificate of Excellence from Tripadvisor for 2011. Casa Colombo is a Conde Nast Hotlist Hotel and has been praised for its interior in publications such as Wallpaper, AD, Elle, Harper's Bazaar, In Style.

Elephanti
Lalin Jinasena is the founder of Elephanti, a free mobile app and website that offers a personalised experience around retail and entertainment and connects people with their favourite stores, venues or brands.

“I recognized the lack of a social platform that is dedicated to both shoppers and merchants and in which people can find and interact with their favorite places and brands without cluttering up their social spaces" says Lalin. In 2010, Lalin recruited a small team of young graduates in Sri Lanka, and within 1 and half years designed and together with his team developed Elephanti.

Elephanti had its debut at the Internet week 2012 in NYC and is headquartered in Singapore.

The Elephanti app proved not to be successful however and is no longer available for download.

References

External links
 

Hoteliers
1977 births
Living people
Sinhalese businesspeople
Alumni of S. Thomas' Preparatory School, Kollupitiya